Dilaj Mahalleh (also Romanized as Dīlaj Maḩalleh; also known as Dīnaj Maḩalleh) is a village in Gil Dulab Rural District, in the Central District of Rezvanshahr County, Gilan Province, Iran. At the 2006 census, its population was 957, in 211 families.

References 

Populated places in Rezvanshahr County